Hermann W. Dommel (born 1933, Germany) received his Diplom Ingenieur in 1959 and Doktoringenieur in 1962, in Electrical engineering, from the Technical University in Munich.
"In the 1960s he pioneered the foundation for the electromagnetic transients program, (EMTP) software that has become an indispensable tool in the power industry", according to the IEEE, winning him in 2013 the IEEE Medal in Power Engineering.
Since 1973, he has been with the University of British Columbia in Vancouver, British Columbia, Canada,
where he is currently Professor Emeritus.

References

1933 births
20th-century German inventors
Academic staff of the University of British Columbia
Technical University of Munich alumni
Fellow Members of the IEEE
Living people
Scientists from Portland, Oregon